Centro Escolar Las Piñas (CELP), formerly named Las Piñas College, is a school located in Pilar Village, Almanza Uno, Las Piñas, Metro Manila, Philippines. The school was founded in 1973, when Dr. Faustino Legaspi Uy opened a School of Nursing under the Graduate of Nursing (GN) Program at the Las Piñas General Hospital – that eventually became Dr. Faustino L. Uy Medical Foundation – as the clinical division. Initially created to provide a nursing program, over the years the school has expanded to provide kindergarten, primary and secondary schooling, along with several bachelors programs and a masters program. It was acquired by Centro Escolar University in 2015 and now serves as a satellite campus of the university.

History
Faustino Legaspi Uy's belief that the community would best be served by combining health care and education formed the basis for founding Las Piñas College. Classes began in June 1975 with courses and programs in kindergarten, elementary, and high school teaching, nursing, the first two years of Liberal Arts, and vocational courses such as automotive repair, dressmaking, tailoring and general clerical. In 1977, the GN Program in the nursing school was phased out and replaced by the Bachelor of Science in Nursing (BSN) Program. Likewise, the two-year Junior Secretarial Course was first offered.

In June 1979, the first two years of Business Administration and Engineering, including the two-year Architectural Drafting, were offered under the aegis of what was at the time, the Ministry of Education, Culture and Sports (MECS); and now the Commission on Higher Education (CHED) working together with the Technical Education Skills Development Authority (TESDA), which oversees the technical and vocational programs.

By the 1982–1983 school year, the department of Education, Culture and Sports allowed the institution to offer a two-year Hotel and Restaurant Management course. That year, the Doña Guillermina Building was completed and construction on the Administrative Building started. In preparation for the college's expansion to become a university, LPC worked to qualify for permission to offer a graduate course in business, leading to a Master's program in Business Administration, but the founder died before this came to be.

Under the management and supervision of the founder's widow, Doctor Luz Co Uy, Las Piñas College earned the recognition permits to offer a Bachelor of Science in Industrial Engineering and in Civil Engineering from CHED in 1993. Later offerings at the B.S. level include Mechanical Engineering, and Accountancy; two-year programs include Nursing Assistant, Computer Secretarial and Technology courses, Office Management and other programs.

By September 2015, Centro Escolar University acquired Las Piñas College. The school is currently being run by Centro Escolar University and undergoing significant renovations to date.

Centro Escolar Las Piñas was granted by CHED the permit to offer a Bachelor of Science in Entrepreneurship (BS-ENT) starting in the school year 2018–2019.

Available education

Basic education
Principal: Mrs. Celia R. Lamarca, MAEd.
K to 12

College courses

NON-SCIENCE PROGRAMS
Program Head: Dr. Frederick A. Halcon

Bachelor of Science in Accountancy
Bachelor of Science in Business Administration
Bachelor of Science in Entrepreneurship
Bachelor of Science in Hospitality Management

SCIENCE PROGRAMS
Dean of Studies: Dr. Leonila C. Abella

Bachelor of Science in Psychology
Bachelor of Science in Nursing

Bachelor of Science in Medical Technology
Bachelor of Science in Pharmacy 
Bachelor of Early Childhood Education
Bachelor of Secondary Education

Graduate programs
Master in Business Administration
Master of Arts in Education
Doctor of Dental Medicine

References

External links
Centro Escolar Las Piñas

Centro Escolar University
Universities and colleges in Metro Manila
Education in Las Piñas